The Sister is a 1769 comedy play by the British writer Charlotte Lennox. Premiering at the Covent Garden Theatre, it was based on Lennox's own 1758 novel Henrietta. The original Covent Garden cast included William Powell as Courtney, William Smith as Lord Clairville, Mary Bulkley as Miss Autumn, Sarah Ward as Lady Autumn and John Cushing as Will. However the play was received by a hostile, organised element of the crowd and was withdrawn after one night.

References

Bibliography
 Baines, Paul & Ferarro, Julian & Rogers, Pat. The Wiley-Blackwell Encyclopedia of Eighteenth-Century Writers and Writing, 1660-1789. Wiley-Blackwell, 2011.
 Carlile, Susan. Charlotte Lennox: An Independent Mind. University of Toronto Press, 2018.

1769 plays
Comedy plays
West End plays
Plays by Charlotte Lennox